EcoLogic Development Fund (EcoLogic), a 501(c)3 nonprofit organization based in Cambridge, Massachusetts, in the United States, advances conservation of critical natural resources in rural Latin America by promoting sustainable livelihoods and strengthening community participation in environmental stewardship. EcoLogic was established to fulfill a mandate voiced by indigenous and environmental leaders at the 1992 Earth Summit to reduce the destruction of significant tropical ecosystems by advancing economic development and self-determination among communities living in and around threatened habitats.  EcoLogic partners with local organizations to promote community-based management of forests and coastal ecosystems, often at the level of microwatersheds; direct water sources and the land cover that helps recharge and clean the water.  Since 1993, EcoLogic has provided direct technical and financial assistance to over 5,000 rural communities and has helped to protect 2,000 water sources throughout Latin America.

Mission and Motivation

Mission

EcoLogic Development Fund is a nonprofit organization whose mission is to empower rural and indigenous people to restore and protect tropical ecosystems in Central America and Mexico.

The Impact of Poverty on Biodiversity
Latin America is home to some of the greatest biodiversity of plants and animals but also some of the poorest people in the western hemisphere. EcoLogic is motivated by the belief that resource use associated with conditions of poverty (slash and burn agriculture, clearcutting, overfishing) places tremendous pressure on fragile ecosystems. Similar threats are posed by ecologically unsustainable activities in mining, agribusiness, and oil exploration. It is the balance between human needs and environmental imperatives that EcoLogic finds most compelling in addressing the future of the planet. Central America alone has lost 19%, the largest percentage for the region. This habitat devastation accelerates the loss of species, endangers critical sources of safe water, and contributes the massive release of greenhouse gases that exacerbates global warming.

Mitigating climate change
One approach that EcoLogic uses to address the anticipated challenges of climate change is to plant and protect trees that store the carbon dioxide our society produces (CO2 sequestration). Tropical forests have been identified as especially effective areas to serve this function. EcoLogic's conservation efforts in the heavily forested areas of Latin America are leading the way in the introduction of sequestration as a solution to local conservation efforts and global environmental well-being. Producing and selling carbon credits benefits poor, rural communities by employing individuals in the planting and maintenance of millions of trees each year. Linking global market demand for forest resources to the communities Ecologic and its partners serve helps halt destructive land-use practices that severely decrease the Earth's capacity to absorb greenhouse gases, protect water, prevent erosion, and support life.

Community self-determination

EcoLogic takes a people-centered approach to the conservation of tropical and semi-tropical habitats, holding that conservation efforts too often impose restrictions that fail to take into account the needs of people living in and around threatened areas.  A goal of long-term, effective stewardship requires understanding and integrating local needs.  Additionally, EcoLogic recognizes that local people are often excluded from important decisions regarding their land, resulting in resource extraction from which they see little benefit.  Thus, EcoLogic employs a strategy of community-led resource management by encouraging those closest to the land to steward resources that meet their needs and in ways that are ecologically compatible.

Highlighted Results for Conservation and Communities

 Between 1993 and 2013, EcoLogic worked with 627 rural and indigenous communities in Central America and Mexico, planted 1,319,500 trees for reforestation and watershed rehabilitation, and built 2,500 fuel-efficient stoves.
 EcoLogic's Belizean partner Sarstoon Temash Institute for Indigenous Management (SATIIM), along with other indigenous groups in southern Belize, won a landmark legal victory in the Supreme Court of Belize that recognizes indigenous land rights around the Sarstoon Temash National Park.
 In Totonicapán, Guatemala, introducing a new tray-based system instead of plastic bags to raise seedlings increased planting rates from 30 seedlings per day to 360, and plant survival rates from 60% to a stunning 98%.
 In 2013, EcoLogic was chosen as one of the top 10 finalists for the Solution Search: Adapting to a Changing Climate contest, sponsored by The Nature Conservancy and Rare for their work in watershed management in northern Honduras with their local partner in the area, the Association of Water Councils in the Southern Sector of Pico Bonito National Park (AJAASSPIB).

Partnerships
Association of Water Committees of the Southern Sector of Pico Bonito National Park (AJAASSPIB)
Regional Environmental Collaborative for the Chinantla Region of Oaxaca, Mexico (FARCO)
Mayan Association for Well-Being in the Sarstun Region (APROSARSTUN)
Municipalities of the Central Atlantida Department (MAMUCA) (Honduras)
Municipality of Olanchito (MACO)
Sarstoon Temash Institute for Indigenous Management (SATIIM)
The Natural Resource Council of the Mayors of the 48 Cantons of Totonicapan
The Northern Border Municipalities Alliance (MFN)
UniversalGiving, an online nonprofit organization to raise fund for EcoLogic project.

References

External links
 Ecologic Development Fund
 Fundación Parque Nacíonal Pico Bonito
 Pronatura Veracruz
 Ak'Tenamit

Environmental organizations based in Massachusetts
Organizations based in Cambridge, Massachusetts